ESO 306-17 is a fossil group giant elliptical galaxy in the Columba constellation, about 1 million light-years in diameter, and roughly 500 million light-years away.

The galaxy is situated alone in a volume of space about it. It is theorized that the galaxy cannibalized its nearest companions, hence, being a fossil group. The galaxy is a giant elliptical of type cD3 (E+3), one of the largest types of galaxies.

References 

 Discovery News, "Bully for ESO 306-17" ,  Jennifer Ouellette, 3 March 2010 (accessed 5 March 2010)
 EurekAlert, "ACS Image of ESO 306-17" , Colleen Sharkey, 4 March 2010 (accessed 5 March 2010)

Columba (constellation)
Elliptical galaxies
17570
306-17
-07-12-009